Maksim or Maxim Karpov may refer to:
 Maksim Karpov (footballer) (born 1995), Russian football player
 Maxim Karpov (ice hockey) (born 1991), Russian professional hockey player